ONE on Prime Video 4: Abbasov vs. Lee (also known as ONE Fight Night 4) was a Combat sport event produced by ONE Championship that took place on November 19, 2022 at the Singapore Indoor Stadium in Kallang, Singapore.

Background 
The organization originally targeted a return to Ryōgoku Kokugikan in Tokyo, Japan to host the event. However, the event was moved to Singapore Indoor Stadium in Kallang, Singapore after announced the main event.

A ONE Welterweight World Championship bout between current champion Kiamrian Abbasov and current ONE Lightweight World Champion Christian Lee (also 2019 ONE Lightweight World Grand Prix Champion) headlined the event. At the weigh-ins, Abbasov weighed in at 186.25 pounds, 1.25 pounds over the limit. As a result, Abbasov was stripped of the title and only Lee was eligible to win it.

A ONE Flyweight Muay Thai World Championship bout between current champion Rodtang Jitmuangnon and current ONE Strawweight Muay Thai Champion Joseph Lasiri took place at the event.

A middleweight bout between former ONE Middleweight and Light Heavyweight World Champion Aung La Nsang and former UFC and WSOF Middleweight title contender Yushin Okami was expected to take place at the event. However, the bout was moved to ONE 163 on same day.

A bantamweight bout between Kwon Won Il and Mark Abelardo was scheduled to take the event. However, on November 4, it was announced that the bout will be moved to ONE 163.

At the weigh-ins, Bibiano Fernandes, Stephen Loman and Jonathan Haggerty all failed hydration test and were forced to take catchweights. Fernandes weighed in at 151.5 lbs, 6.5 pounds over the limit, Loman came in at 153.25 lbs, 8.25 lbs over the bantamweight limit, and Haggerty at 148 lbs, 3 pounds over the limit. The bout proceeded at catchweight with Haggerty being fined 20% of his purse, which went to his opponent Vladimir Kuzmin. Fernandes and Loman scheduled to meet but to both were unable to make weight in the bantamweight (135 – 145 lbs) and the bout agreed to 153.25 lbs catchweight.

Results

Bonus awards 
The following fighters received $50,000 bonuses.
Performance of the Night: Christian Lee, Cosmo Alexandre and Danielle Kelly

See also 

 2022 in ONE Championship
 List of ONE Championship events
 List of current ONE fighters

References 

Events in Singapore
ONE Championship events
2022 in mixed martial arts
Mixed martial arts in Singapore
Sports competitions in Singapore
November 2022 sports events in Singapore